Sophie Rundle (born 21 April 1988) is an English actress, best known for portraying Ada Thorne in the BBC One historical crime drama television series Peaky Blinders, Ann Walker in BBC One and HBO's period drama Gentleman Jack, Vicky Budd in the BBC television series Bodyguard, code-breaker Lucy in the ITV drama series The Bletchley Circle and Labia in the British/American television sitcom Episodes. She also played Alice in Sky One's 2017 drama Jamestown.

Early life
Rundle was born in High Wycombe, Buckinghamshire. She has two brothers. She attended Bournemouth School for Girls. In 2011, Rundle graduated from the Royal Academy of Dramatic Art with a Bachelor of Arts (BA) Degree in Acting.

Career

Screen
Rundle started her career in the British horror comedy film Small Town Folk in 2007 opposite Warwick Davis. Later in 2012, she starred in the ITV four-part television miniseries period drama, Titanic, created by producer Nigel Stafford-Clark and written by Julian Fellowes, which is based on the sinking of the RMS Titanic. Later that year, she guest-starred as Labia in the British/American television sitcom Episodes opposite Matt LeBlanc and Stephen Mangan, which aired on Showtime and BBC Two.

Also in 2012, Rundle appeared in Great Expectations directed by Mike Newell. The film premiered at the 2012 Toronto International Film Festival and was released in the UK on 30 November 2012.

Rundle also played Sefa in the two-part episode Arthur's Bane of the final season of the BBC TV series Merlin.

She played a lead role in the ITV mystery drama series The Bletchley Circle, about four women who investigate a series of murders, and ended on 27 January 2014. On the series' cancellation, Rundle stated:

She also appears as Ada Shelby in the BBC Two period crime drama series Peaky Blinders, based on the memoirs of the Shelby family, whose many brothers, sisters, and relatives make up the fiercest gang of all in interwar Birmingham. On mastering the Brummie accent during production, Rundle said that she and the rest of the cast had struggled with it at first because it is not heard much on television, but managed to master the accent after a set visit in Birmingham. Also, in an interview with Radio Times, in regards to her casting in the series, Rundle stated:

Rundle played the lead role of Fiona Griffiths, a young detective constable in the Sky Living two-part crime series Talking to the Dead, based on the eponymous novel by Harry Bingham. It was adapted by Golden Globe Award-nominee Gwyneth Hughes. On playing Fiona Griffiths, Rundle did some research on Cotard's Syndrome to portray Griffiths accurately. She agrees that her character in the series is a little "loopy": "Well, yes. Part of the mystery of the show is trying to work out what is going on with her. You know that there is a history of trauma there and you are trying to figure that out. It is being fed to you in little bits. She has a history of mental health issues too, which gives her an affinity with the dead."

Rundle guest-starred as Pamela Saint, a young mother who suffers mental health problems after delivering her child, in the seventh episode of the third series of the BBC medical period drama series Call the Midwife, which aired on 2 March 2014. She also starred in the six-part BBC One police procedural series Happy Valley as Kirsten McAskill, a rookie policewoman who stops Lewis (played by Adam Long) for speeding and is then run over by his accomplice in a recent kidnapping, Tommy (portrayed by James Norton), a convicted drug offender, thus killing her. On the dramatic development for her character throughout the series, Rundle hinted that she [Kirsten], "is so young and eager and enthusiastic about her job, it's a real shock when what happens happens — and it's quite exciting as well." The series debuted on 29 April 2014, and was created by Sally Wainwright which stars Sarah Lancashire and Steve Pemberton.

On 4 October 2014, Rundle appeared in the live cooking programme Saturday Kitchen presented by James Martin as an interviewed guest.

Rundle starred as Eva Smith/Daisy Renton in Helen Edmundson's BBC adaptation of J.B. Priestley's An Inspector Calls, which also starred David Thewlis portraying the title role, Ken Stott and Miranda Richardson. The drama was directed by Aisling Walsh and was broadcast on BBC One on 13 September 2015. In June 2015, Rundle starred as Jenny in the Channel 4 sitcom Not Safe for Work alongside Zawe Ashton, Tom Weston-Jones, Samuel Barnett, Sacha Dhawan and Anastasia Hille. The series was created and written by playwright D. C. Moore and was broadcast on 30 June 2015.

Rundle also portrayed Honoria Barbary in BBC's 20-part Dickensian, a reworking of an ensemble of characters created by Charles Dickens, which aired on BBC One on 26 December 2015.

In 2016, Rundle starred in the ITV's six-part series titled Brief Encounters, which is loosely based on Gold Group International CEO, Jacqueline Gold's 1995 memoir, Good Vibrations. Asked about her opinion of her character in the series (set in the 1980s) during an interview with i, Rundle explained that she would be restless and excited on her sexuality if she was a teenager during that era.

In 2017, Rundle starred in Sky 1's drama Jamestown as Alice Kett, one of the '"maids to make wives" who sailed 3,700 miles across the Atlantic to marry a stranger in the New World'. What made Rundle to be interested in her role in the series is her opportunity to portray women of bravery and dynamism, in an interview with i. Also in an article with the Irish Examiner, Rundle insisted that her character in the series is the sort of person audience want to watch as stated:

In 2018, Rundle appeared in the six-part thriller, Bodyguard created by Jed Mercurio, with Keeley Hawes and Gina McKee, broadcast on BBC One. The series tells the fictional story of a war veteran now working as a Specialist Protection Officer for the Royalty and Specialist Protection Branch (RaSP) of London's Metropolitan Police. In the same year, Rundle portrayed wealthy heiress Ann Walker, in the joint production between BBC One and HBO biographical drama series about a real-life lesbian couple living in the North of England in the 19th century, titled Gentleman Jack, alongside Suranne Jones and Timothy West. As the series is created by Sally Wainwright, whom Rundle has worked with in Happy Valley, Rundle explained that she was used to Wainwright's writing and intended to be involved before receiving an email regarding the offer to be cast in the series, and was enthused after reading the scripts. On portraying the character, Rundle shared that she has to engage her feelings and emotions in order to fit of those of Ann Walker:

In 2019, Rundle portrayed Princess Diana in an episode of the Sky Arts' Urban Myths series, with David Avery as Freddie Mercury and Mathew Baynton as Kenny Everett.

In 2020, Rundle starred alongside Martin Compston in BBC One programme, The Nest, a five-part psychological drama about a husband and wife who meet an 18-year-old woman who agrees to be their surrogate after years of their trying for a baby. She also appeared in Netflix's The Midnight Sky, playing Jean Sullivan.  She also starred in the film Rose as the titular character with her husband Matt Stokoe who also wrote the film.

In 2023, Rundle starred in the Alibi political thriller The Diplomat as Laura Simmonds, a British consul who is determined to protect British nationals who are involved in a series of conflicts in Barcelona. In an interview with Radio Times, Rundle said she felt happy and pleased that filming is to take place abroad after reading the scripts she received by her agent through email. She also explained the long-running mystery storyline integrating with minor stand-alone storylines that allows the series' cast to explore different characters and different scenarios that the main character [Laura Simmonds] would be involved in. She commented that she can easily portray Laura Simmonds because she can relate the character to several people whom she knew before:

On 16 February 2023, it was announced that Rundle will star in the upcoming ITV's six-part mystery thriller series titled After the Flood as PC Joanna Marshall, a police officer investigating the death of a man after a natural disaster struck.

Stage
In February 2013, Rundle played Bunty Mainwaring in Stephen Unwin's production of Noël Coward's The Vortex at the Rose Theatre, Kingston.

In December 2014, she played Lucia Kos in a new play titled 3 Winters by London-based Croatian playwright Tena Štivičić, about the Kos family, living at three crucial periods in Croatian history. The play is directed by Howard Davies at the National Theatre.

Personal life 
Rundle is engaged to actor Matt Stokoe, whom she met on the set of Jamestown. They have a son born in 2021.

Filmography

Film

Television

Radio

Theatre

References

External links
 
 

1988 births
Living people
Actors from Bournemouth
People from High Wycombe
Actresses from Buckinghamshire
Actresses from Dorset
Alumni of RADA
English film actresses
English television actresses
20th-century English actresses
21st-century English actresses